The China Media Group Headquarters is a , 27-story-tall office tower and television complex  at 11 Fuxin Road in Haidian District, Beijing, China. Construction began in 1983 and was completed in 1986 with the official opening in 1987. It was named CCTV Headquarters or CCTV Building at the time was official inaugurated on 1988.

See also

 List of tallest buildings in Beijing
Media buildings in Beijing
 China Media Group Headquarters
 Central Radio & TV Tower
 CCTV Headquarters
 Beijing Television Cultural Center
 Beijing TV Centre
 Phoenix Center

References

Further reading

External links

China Media Group
Buildings and structures in Haidian District
Office buildings completed in 1986
1986 establishments in China
Skyscraper office buildings in Beijing
Deconstructivism
Postmodern architecture in China